Christopher Rigg (born 18 June 2007) is an English professional footballer who plays as a midfielder for Sunderland.

Club career

Early life
Rigg was born in Hebburn. He joined Sunderland while still in primary school.

Sunderland
With Sunderland facing numerous injuries in their squad, Rigg was named on the bench for the EFL Championship game against Blackpool on 1 January 2023. Less than a week later, he was again named on the bench, alongside fellow young player Tom Watson, for an FA Cup third round game against Shrewsbury Town, with manager Tony Mowbray saying Rigg was "really impressive", having watched him train with the first team.

He made his professional debut in the game against Shrewsbury Town on 7 January 2023, coming on as a substitute for Édouard Michut in a 2–1 win. In doing so, he became the second youngest player in Sunderland history, behind Derek Forster. Following his debut, he was promoted to the Sunderland first team, having to train with the squad only one or two days a week, as he was still in school at the time.

Rigg's second appearance for Sunderland would come again in the FA Cup, this time against Fulham, replacing Patrick Roberts in the 86th minute. In additional time, with the score at 1–1, he received a cut back from Abdoullah Ba, before firing a shot into the roof of the Fulham goal, only to have the goal disallowed due to Ba being offside when he received the ball himself.

International career
Rigg has represented England at youth international level. He captained England at under-16 level, before being promoted to the under-17 squad while still only fifteen.

Career statistics

References

2007 births
Living people
People from Hebburn
English footballers
England youth international footballers
Association football midfielders
Sunderland A.F.C. players
Footballers from Tyne and Wear